The Kavi Guru Express series of trains were introduced by Indian Railways in 2011 for the 1st time together with the Rajya Rani Express. They were introduced by the then Railway Minister of India Ms. Mamata Banerjee in honour of Rabindranath Tagore. There were 4 trains proposed in the budget to operate as part of the series

Service 
 12949/12950 Porbandar–Santragachi Kavi Guru Express
 13015/13016 Howrah–Bhagalpur Kavi Guru Express
 13027/13028 Howrah–Azimganj Kavi Guru Express
 19709/19710 Udaipur City–Kamakhya Kavi Guru Express

However out of the four, only the 12949/12950 Porbandar–Santragachi Kavi Guru Express is classed as a Superfast Express.

See also 
 Duronto Express
 Rajya Rani Express
 Vivek Express
 Yuva Express

References 

 http://timesofindia.indiatimes.com/rail-budget-2011/Several-new-trains-proposed-in-Railway-Budget/articleshow/7570234.cms
 http://media2.intoday.in/businesstoday/images/RailBudget_2011-12.pdf
 http://www.thehindu.com/news/national/special-trains-to-commemorate-rabindranath-tagore-swami-vivekananda-birth-anniversaries/article1489454.ece

External links